This is a list of British television related events in 1931.

Events

There are no events in 1931 in British television.

Births

 10 January – Peter Barnes, playwright and screenwriter (died 2004)
 2 February – Les Dawson, comedian (died 1993)
 15 February – Claire Bloom, actress
 18 February – Ned Sherrin, producer (died 2007)
 28 February – Peter Alliss, professional golfer, television commentator and golf course designer (died 2020)
 7 April – Lynne Perrie, actress (died 2006)
 8 April – Beryl Vertue, producer and media executive (died 2022)
 14 April – Kenneth Cope, actor
 7 June – Virginia McKenna, actress
 2 July – Frank Williams, comic actor (died 2022)
 25 August – Bryan Mosley, actor (died 1999)
 8 September – Jack Rosenthal, screenwriter and playwright (died 2004)
 22 September – Fay Weldon, screenwriter, playwright and novelist (died 2023)
 23 October – Diana Dors, actress (died 1984)

See also
 1931 in British music
 1931 in the United Kingdom
 List of British films of 1931

References